This was a new event on the ITF Women's Circuit.

Shuko Aoyama and Makoto Ninomiya won the inaugural event, defeating Eri Hozumi and Kurumi Nara in an all-Japanese final, 3–6, 6–2, [10–7].

Seeds

Draw

References 
 Draw

Ando Securities Open - Doubles
Ando Securities Open